Terence 'Banjo' Bannon, born 24 November 1967 in Newry, County Down, Northern Ireland is a mountaineer and adventurer. Bannon became the second person from Northern Ireland to reach the summit of Mount Everest on 31 May 2003 (The first person was Dawson Stelfox who ascended Everest on 27 May 1993. Bannon was among this party however did not reach the summit.) In 2006 he attempted to climb K2; however the attempt was aborted after the deaths of a number of the expedition members.

Monument
A large stone monolith intended to commemorate Bannon's feat was unveiled by the mayor of Newry, Councillor Jack Patterson, outside Newry Town Hall on 28 May 2004.

References

Summiters of Mount Everest
Living people
Irish mountain climbers
1967 births
People from County Down